Flair Airlines is a Canadian ultra low-cost carrier (ULCC) headquartered in Edmonton, Alberta. The airline operates scheduled passenger and chartered services with a fleet of Boeing 737 aircraft. The company slogan is Plane and Simple. The airline promotes itself as being Canada's first and only independent ULCC.

History

2005–2008

The airline began operations as a privately owned company on August 19, 2005, under the name Flair Air. In January 2006, Transport Canada authorised the airline to operate scheduled all-cargo services between Cuba and Canada, on behalf of Cubana de Aviación, until April 7, 2006. It also operated some passenger flights on behalf of Cubana. Flair Air operated two Boeing 727-200 aircraft, one for passenger movements and the other for freight services. During this period, Flair also began providing workforce transportation services to several natural resources and major construction companies across Canada.

2008–2019

Flair began adding Boeing 737-400s to its fleet in 2008 to replace the 727-200s. The airline continued to add these aircraft until delivery of a fifth aircraft in 2015. In January 2014, Flair acquired a VIP Embraer ERJ-175 and a VIP Dornier Do-328. Both were retired in September 2016. In June 2017, Flair announced it had purchased the assets of Manitoba-based discount travel company NewLeaf, of which it had been the operator of NewLeaf's flights, as it was not licensed as an airline. Flair retained 85% of former NewLeaf staff in the acquisition, and the NewLeaf brand was retired on July 25, 2017, with flights subsequently operated under the Flair name thereafter.

In late 2017, Flair Air rebranded as Flair Airlines, in which it unveiled a new magenta and blue livery, acquired additional aircraft, and announced plans to add more in 2018 and 2019. Two more 737-400s arrived at the airline in December 2017. In 2018, Flair moved its headquarters from Kelowna International Airport to Edmonton International Airport, and 777 Partners invested in Flair with the goal of building a Canadian low-fare carrier. In December 2018, Flair received three leased Boeing 737-800s. These were returned to lessor Smartwings in 2019 as a separately leased trio of 737-800s arrived at the airline.

2019 rebranding–present

In February 2019, Flair went through a "top to bottom" makeover, changing its signature colours from purple and red to acid green and black. This reflected the airline's new "Plane and Simple" branding. The brand makeover included a new livery that currently remains on the airline's three 737-800s. New flight attendant uniforms were also rolled out in September 2019.

In February 2020, Flair offered unlimited travel in the form of a one-time fee 90-day pass valid between February 13 and May 13, 2020. Later in the year, Flair retired their final Boeing 737-400 aircraft in August 2020 as an impact of the COVID-19 pandemic.

In January 2021, Flair announced an order for 13 Boeing 737 MAX 8 jets, with plans to grow to 50 aircraft within 5 years, and the aircraft to be leased from financing partner 777 Partners. The first of these aircraft arrived in May 2021, with a total of 8 scheduled to arrive over the summer months. The remaining five were planned to arrive before 2022. 777 Partner's full order consisted of 24 MAX 8s, with options for 60 more. This order came at a crucial time for Boeing, as it dealt with a revamp of MAX operations following a months-long grounding of the type. All future aircraft deliveries to Flair were additionally to be painted in an updated livery, which includes the airline's signature acid green and black colours, as well as subtle highlights of light purple. Flair ordered an additional 14 Boeing 737 MAX 8s in December 2021.

Regulatory concerns 
In March 2022, the Canadian Transportation Agency (CTA) ruled that Flair may be in violation of the law that requires it to be controlled by Canadians, and stated that the airline's operating licence may be suspended. Flair denied that it is in violation of Canadian laws and asked for an 18-month exemption to address regulatory concerns. Jones stated that the company would overhaul its board and refinance its debt to reduce foreign influence on the company. The National Airlines Council of Canada, which represents Air Canada, Air Transat, and WestJet released a statement asking the CTA to reject Flair's request. In a statement issued on April 21, Jones stated that the airline had a "zero chance" of losing its operating licence and criticised the lack of competition in the Canadian airline industry. On June 1, 2022, the CTA allowed Flair to keep its operating licence after concluding the airline is Canadian.

Aircraft seizures
On March 11, 2023, Airborne Capital Ltd. seized four of its planes operated by Flair over alleged non-payment. In a press conference, Flair CEO Stephen Jones suggested the seizures were motivated by competitors, and that the airline owed around US$1million on the leases, and was in the process of making payment when the seizures occurred . The lessor, Airborne alleged that Flair had repeatedly missed payments amounting to several millions of dollars over a period of five months. Flair used other aircraft to continue to operate its schedule.

Charters

Workforce transportation
Between 2007 and 2010 Flair was the exclusive supplier of large aircraft lift to Shell Canada's project at Albian Sands where, at its peak, the airline was moving over 10,000 construction workers per month from 14 points across Canada into Shell's project site, north of Fort McMurray, Alberta.

On October 7, 2013, Flair announced that it had entered into a ten-year agreement with Shell Energy Canada to provide exclusive air charter transportation services within Canada. Flair will provide logistics planning, passenger reservations, and third-party charter aircraft procurement, all of which will be accomplished by a new workforce transportation services company called North Sands Air Services.

Around the world tours
In September 2010, Flair was approached by an Ontario-based tour company to operate a world tour program. The program included travelling to 14 countries worldwide. Flair reconfigured one of its Boeing 737-400s from 158 economy class seats to 76 business class seats. Flair obtained international permits, over-flight permissions, and ground arrangements to operate in each of the 14 countries.

In 2011, Flair operated another world tour to 14 new destinations. In October 2013, Flair operated a South American tour to 10 destinations.

Government charters
Flair has provided ongoing personnel movement for the Department of National Defence and other departments of the Canadian federal government.

ACMI charters
Flair also offers aircraft, complete crew, maintenance, and insurance (aircraft, complete crew, maintenance, and insurance or ACMI) charters which provide customers with a 'turn-key' aircraft package.

Passenger charters
Flair used to operate flights on behalf of other Canadian airlines, such as Air Transat.

Destinations

Flair's scheduled destinations consist mostly of destinations in Canada, with additional destinations in Mexico and the United States. The airline has also operated charter flights on demand to worldwide destinations.

Fleet

Current fleet

, Flair Airlines operates the following aircraft:

Former fleet

Flair Airlines has previously operated the following aircraft types:

Cabin and services
Flair's aircraft are configured with 186 or 189 economy class seats in a 3–3 layout. As a low-cost carrier, the airline charges additional fees for various services and amenities, including additional baggage allowances and in-flight catering. Flair offers in-flight entertainment via mobile app or web browser; however, the airline does not offer in-flight Wi-Fi internet access.

References

External links

2005 establishments in British Columbia
Air Transport Association of Canada
Airlines established in 2005
Canadian companies established in 2005
Companies based in Edmonton
Low-cost carriers
Charter airlines of Canada
Cargo airlines of Canada
Privately held companies of Canada